John Mannion may refer to:

 John Mannion Snr (1907–1978), Irish Fine Gael politician
 John Mannion Jnr (1944–2006), his son, Irish Fine Gael politician
 John Mannion (American politician), member of the New York State Senate